The enzyme carnitine decarboxylase catalyzes the chemical reaction

carnitine  2-methylcholine + CO2

This enzyme belongs to the family of lyases, specifically the carboxy-lyases, which cleave carbon-carbon bonds.  The systematic name of this enzyme class is carnitine carboxy-lyase (2-methylcholine-forming). This enzyme is also called carnitine carboxy-lyase.  It employs one cofactor, ATP.

References

 

EC 4.1.1
Enzymes of unknown structure